= Joint Advocacy Initiative =

The Joint Advocacy Initiative (JAI) was established in December 2001 between the East Jerusalem Young Men's Christian Association and the Young Women's Christian Association of Palestine.

The Joint Advocacy Initiative (JAI) work aims to bring about change at the local level through involving Palestinian organizations and individuals to work to gain their basic rights and to engage in processes to effect social change.

At the international level, its work aims to channel changes in the World YWCA/YMCA, Church Related Organizations and civil society organizations to create a global movement that puts pressure on Israel to implement international law and respond to the United Nations resolutions concerning the occupation of Palestine by exposing injustice and guiding actions.
